Bjørn Barth (born 22 March 1931 – 1 May 2014) was a Norwegian diplomat and ambassador.

Biography
He was born at Sandefjord in Vestfold, Norway. He entered the  Norwegian Foreign Service  in 1959. He served in numerous positions including with the embassy in Brussels (1973-1977), with Norway's  delegation to the OECD in Paris 1975-1976 and the Embassy of Washington, D.C. (1977-1981). He also served as the Norwegian ambassador to Baghdad (1981-82),  to the OECD in Paris (1989-93),  to Athens (1993-96) and at The Hague (1996-99).

References

1931 births
2014 deaths
People from Sandefjord
Norwegian civil servants
Norwegian diplomats
Ambassadors of Norway to Iraq
Ambassadors of Norway to Greece
Ambassadors of Norway to the Netherlands
Grand Crosses of the Order of the Phoenix (Greece)
 Recipients of the St. Olav's Medal